Percival May Davson (30 September 1877 – 5 December 1959) was a British fencer and tennis player. He won a silver medal in the team épée event at the 1912 Summer Olympics. He also competed in the Davis Cup in 1919.

In April 1913 Percival won the singles title at the British Covered Court Championships after defeating Erik Larsen in the final in four sets.

Davson was ranked World No. 8 in 1919 by A. Wallis Myers of The Daily Telegraph.

References

External links
 
 
 
 

1877 births
1959 deaths
British people in British Guiana
British male fencers
British male tennis players
Fencers at the 1908 Summer Olympics
Fencers at the 1912 Summer Olympics
Olympic fencers of Great Britain
Olympic silver medallists for Great Britain
Olympic medalists in fencing
Medalists at the 1912 Summer Olympics
20th-century British people